Alfonso Castañeda (born 1920) is a Mexican former sports shooter. He competed in the 25 metre pistol event at the 1956 Summer Olympics.

References

External links
 

1920 births
Possibly living people
Mexican male sport shooters
Olympic shooters of Mexico
Shooters at the 1956 Summer Olympics
Place of birth missing (living people)